Marfa Municipal Airport  is three miles north of Marfa  in Presidio County, Texas. There is currently no scheduled airline service to the airport; until 1960 Trans-Texas DC-3s stopped at the former Marfa AAF, now abandoned, at 30.256N 103.882W east of Marfa.

Facilities
It has two asphalt runways: 13/31 is 6,214 by 75 feet (1,894 x 23 m) and 4/22 is 5,307 by 75 feet (1,618 x 23 m). A third runway, 9/27, is 2,825 by 60 feet (861 x 18 m) dirt.

In the year ending April 23, 2007 the airport had 15,000 aircraft operations, average 41 per day, all general aviation. 18 aircraft were then based at the airport: 61% single-engine, 6% multi-engine and 33% glider.

Glider activity
In April 2008 the Marfa Airport was recognized as the 15th National Landmark of Soaring by the National Soaring Museum.

Marfa Gliders offers sailplane flight training and glider rides all year and hosts a soaring camp in spring.

References

External links 
 

Airports in Texas
Gliderports in the United States
Transportation in Presidio County, Texas
Buildings and structures in Presidio County, Texas
Marfa, Texas